Fredericellidae is a family of bryozoans belonging to the order Plumatellida.

Genera:
 Fredericella Gervais, 1838 
 Internectella Gruncharova, 1971

References

Bryozoan families